Panna National Park is a national park located in Panna and Chhatarpur districts of Madhya Pradesh in India. 
It was declared in 1994 as the twenty second Tiger reserve of India and the fifth in Madhya Pradesh,
Panna was given the Award of Excellence in 2007 as the best maintained national park of India by the Ministry of Tourism of India. It is notable that by 2009, the entire tiger population had been eliminated by poaching with the collusion of forest department officials.

Geography
The forests of Panna National Park along with Ken Gharial Sanctuary and adjoining territorial divisions form a significant part of the catchment area of the  Ken River, which runs northeast for about  through the park.
Panna National Park and the surrounding forest area of North and South Panna forest division is the only large chunk of wildlife habitat remaining in northern Madhya Pradesh.
The National Park is situated at a point where the continuity of the tropical and subtropical dry broadleaf forests belt, which starts from Cape Comorin in South India, is broken and beyond this the Upper Gangetic Plains moist deciduous forests of the great Indo-Gangetic Plain begins. 
This area is the northernmost tip of the natural teak forests and the easternmost tip of the natural 'Kardhai' Anogeissus pendula forests.

Fauna

Among the animals found here are the Bengal tiger, Indian leopard, chital, chinkara, nilgai, Sambar deer and sloth bear, rusty-spotted cat, Asian palm civet. The park is home to more than 200 species of birds including the bar-headed goose, crested honey buzzard, red-headed vulture, blossom-headed parakeet, changeable hawk-eagle and Indian vulture.

Tiger Reserve

Panna National Park was declared as one of the Tiger reserves of India in 1994/95 and placed under the protection of Project Tiger. 
The decline of tiger population in Panna has been reported several times. 
Two female tigers were relocated there from Bandhavgarh National Park and Kanha National Park in March 2009. However, the last male tiger had already disappeared. 
A committee to look into the disappearance of the tigers was formed.

In June 2009, it was officially announced that the Reserve, which had over 40 tigers six years earlier, had no tigers left and only two tigresses, which were brought in a little earlier 
In February 2012, only three years later, the entire tiger population of the reserve was considered eliminated. The Madhya Pradesh government did not determine responsibility for the debacle, nor did it pass the inquiry to the Central Bureau of Investigation in spite of requests from the Ministry of Environment and Forests and the Prime Minister's Office.

The Ministry of Environment and Forests (MoEF) approved a proposal to translocate two tigers and two tigresses to the reserve. One female each from Bandhavgarh National Park (coded T1) and Kanha National Park (T2) were translocated to Panna Tiger Reserve. A tiger male, coded T3, was brought from Pench Tiger Reserve but strayed out of the park shortly thereafter, in November 2009 The tiger started walking towards its home in Pench National Park, indicating homing instinct. It moved steadily through human dominated landscape without causing any conflict. Forest department staff tracked it continuously for over a month and finally brought it back to the Panna Tiger Reserve. It then settled well, established territory and started mating. The tigress, T1, translocated from Bandhavgarh National Park, gave birth to four cubs in April 2010 of which 2 survive till date.
The second tigress, T2, translocated from Kanha National Park gave birth to four cubs several months later and all four survive till date.
A third tigress, coded T4, an orphaned cub was reintroduced to Panna in March 2011.
She learnt hunting skills with the help of the male and mated with him. She was found dead on 19 September 2014 of an infection caused by its radio collar. Her sister T5 was released in Panna in November 2011.

Panna Biosphere Reserve
The Panna Biosphere Reserve was designated in 2020 by UNESCO. It encompasses Panna National Park, three sections of the Gangau Wildlife Sanctuary (I, III and IV) and the reserved and protected forests of the North Panna Forest Division. The reserve provides significant habitat for the Bengal tiger (Panthera tigris tigris). Other resident animals in the reserve include the caracal or siyah gosh (Caracal caracal) and the jungle cat (Felis chaus). Over 280 species of birds have been recorded, including the Indian paradise flycatcher (Terpsiphone paradisi).

The biosphere reserve includes protected areas and minimally-disturbed areas, including over 300 villages. The reserve has a total area of 299,898 ha, with 79,253 ha of core area, 98,720 ha of buffer zone, and 121,925 ha of transition zone. The reserve includes forests, woodlands, wetlands, farms, and wastelands.

Residents of the reserve practice agriculture, horticulture, and forestry, and gather kattha, gum, resins, and medicinal plants from the forests.

Effect of Ken Betwa River Linking Project
The Government of India along with Government of Madhya Pradesh and Government of Uttar Pradesh have planned to link the Ken River with Betwa River. This involves construction of 283m long Daudhan Dam. The project aims to transfer excess water from Ken basin to Betwa basin thus provide water access to the drought prone region of Bundelkhand.

This construction will cause inundation of 400 hectares of land of 4300 hectare Panna Tiger reserve. Environmentalist are afraid that this will adversely affect the population of tigers in the region.

References

External links

 Map of the Reserve
 

Tiger reserves of India
Panna, India
Bundelkhand
National parks in Madhya Pradesh
1981 establishments in Madhya Pradesh
Protected areas established in 1981